A New Hallelujah is a live album by Christian recording artist Michael W. Smith. Released in October 2008, this is Smith's third album of worship music, and his fourth live album. It was recorded on June 20, 2008 at Lakewood Church in Houston, Texas. A DVD version of the album was released in March 2009 along with additional bonus features: Behind The Scenes: A New Hallelujah including four new tracks from the live concert.

Track listing

Personnel 

 Michael W. Smith – lead vocals, keyboards, acoustic guitar (5, 6), drum section on "Prepare Intro"
 Jim Daneker – keyboards, Hammond B3 organ, programming
 Ben Gowell – electric guitar
 Adam Lester – electric guitar
 Christa Black – acoustic guitar, violin, backing vocals
 Matt Smallbone – bass
 Michael Olson – drums
 Aimee Jones Beard – backing vocals
 Stephen Jackson – backing vocals
 Fiona Mellett – backing vocals
 Michael Mellett – backing vocals, choir director
 The Lakewood Church Choir – adult choir
 The African Children's Choir – children's choir (3, 4); directed by Alice Nabwami
 Coal Zamorano – Spanish solo (11)
 Israel Houghton – guest lead vocals (14)
 Matt Payne – drum section on "Prepare Intro"
 Spence Smith – drum section on "Prepare Intro"

Production

 Michael W. Smith – producer, arrangements 
 Chaz Corzine – associate producer
 Michael Blanton – executive producer
 Bob Ezrin – executive producer
 Terry Hemmings – executive producer
 Rob Burrell – engineer, mixing
 Hank Williams – mastering at MasterMix, Nashville, Tennessee
 Traci Sterling Bishir – production coordination
 Michelle Box – A&R production
 Jason McArthur – A&R coordination
 Louis Deluca – photography
 Tim Parker – design
 Ron Roark – design
 Trish Townsend – stylist

Reception
The album won two 2009 Dove Awards at the 40th GMA Dove Awards, for Best Inspirational Recorded Song and Best Praise & Worship Album. and was a new hallelujah unedited version.

Charts

Weekly charts

Year-end charts

Certifications

References

2008 live albums
2008 video albums
Live video albums
Michael W. Smith live albums
Michael W. Smith video albums
Reunion Records albums

fo:It's a Wonderful Christmas